Events in the year 2021 in Samoa.

Incumbents
 O le Ao o le Malo: Va'aletoa Sualauvi II
 Prime Minister: Tuilaepa Aiono Sailele Malielegaoi

Events
Ongoing — COVID-19 pandemic in Samoa

9 April – The April 2021 Samoan general election was held.

Deaths

January 19 – Toleafoa Ken Vaafusuaga Poutoa, politician, MP (since 2016).
January 25 – Masada Iosefa, 32, rugby league player (Penrith Panthers, Wests Tigers, national team); traffic collision.
January 27 – Saini Lemamea, 56, rugby union player (national team). (death announced on this date)

References

 
2020s in Samoa
Years of the 21st century in Samoa
Samoa
Samoa